The Shadow Elves is an accessory for the Dungeons & Dragons fantasy role-playing game.

Contents
The Shadow Elves gazetteer which describes the underground region where the shadow elves live.

Publication history
GAZ13 The Shadow Elves was written by Carl Sargent and Gary Thomas, with a cover by Clyde Caldwell, and was published by TSR in 1990 as a 64-page booklet and a 32-page booklet, with a large color map and an outer folder. Later printings merged the two Guides into one 96-page booklet; although they did not repaginate the new booklet.

Reception

Reviews
GamesMaster International (Issue 4 - Nov 1990)

References

Dungeons & Dragons Gazetteers
Mystara
Role-playing game supplements introduced in 1990